Dohrmann is a surname. Notable people with the surname include:

Angela Dohrmann (born 1965), American actress and television personality
Elsie Dohrmann (1875–1909), New Zealand educator and activist
George Dohrmann (born 1973), writer for Sports Illustrated, author of Play Their Hearts Out and winner of the Pulitzer Prize
Helge Dohrmann (1939–1989), Danish politician

See also
Dorman
Dohrmann's, originally Parmelee-Dohrmann, a china, crystal and silver store with stores in Los Angeles and San Francisco